"Nothing Ever Happens" is a song by the Scottish rock band Del Amitri.

Released as a single on 1 January 1990, it reached #11 in the UK Singles Chart and was the band's biggest hit in the UK; and was also a top-10 hit in Ireland, peaking at #4. It is the last track on the album Waking Hours.

Track listing
A-side
"Nothing Ever Happens"
B-side
"So Many Souls To Change"
"Don't I Look Like The Kind Of Guy You Used To Hate"
"Evidence"

References

External links 
 "On The Record: Justin Currie – Nothing Ever Happens by Del Amitri" at .bbc.co.uk

1989 singles
1990 singles
Del Amitri songs
1989 songs
A&M Records singles
Song recordings produced by Hugh Jones (producer)